San José La Arada is a municipality in the Chiquimula department of Guatemala. It has a population of 8,756 (2018 census) and cover an area of 121 km2.

References

Municipalities of the Chiquimula Department